Överuman or Uman is a lake on the border between Norway and Sweden.  Most of the  lake is located in Storuman Municipality in Västerbotten County (southern Swedish Lapland) in Sweden.  A small  part of the lake, known as Umbukta, is located in Rana Municipality in Nordland County in Norway.  The European route E12 highway runs along the eastern side of the lake.  The lake lies just southeast of the large lake Storakersvatnet.

See also
 List of lakes in Norway
 Geography of Norway

References

Lakes of Nordland
Rana, Norway
Norway–Sweden border
International lakes of Europe
Lakes of Västerbotten County